Al-Watan ( meaning The Homeland) is a daily morning Arabic language political newspaper based in Doha, Qatar. The paper is one of the three Arabic newspapers in the country along with Al Raya and Al Sharq.

History and circulation
Al-Watan was founded in 1995 and was the first newspaper to be launched in Qatar after the Emir, Sheikh Hamad bin Khalifa Al Thani, abolished press censorship. Its parent company is Dar Al Watan Printing, Publishing and Distribution Company WLL. With the publication of the daily the other leading Qatari Arabic paper Al Raya lost its one-third of its circulation. The 2008 circulation of the daily was 15,000.

In 2020 the website Industry Arabic named Al-Watan as the fourth influential Arabic newspaper.

Ownership
The former foreign minister, Hamad bin Jassim Al Thani, owns half of the newspaper.

References

External links
Al Watan ePaper
Al-Watan (Qatar) via KnowledgeView

Newspapers established in 1995
1995 establishments in Qatar
Newspapers published in Qatar
Arabic-language newspapers
Mass media in Doha